Kira Katharina Walkenhorst (born 18 November 1990) is a retired German beach volleyball player who played as a blocker. She has an older brother Alexander Walkenhorst who is a professional beach volleyball player  and a younger sister Pia Walkenhorst who also plays beach volleyball.

Walkenhorst won the gold medal at the 2016 Summer Olympics in Rio de Janeiro together and at the 2017 World Championships with her teammate Laura Ludwig. She also won bronze medals at the 2013 and 2014 European Beach Volleyball Championships and gold medals at the 2015 and 2016 Beach ECH alongside her teammate Laura Ludwig.

She retired from competition at the start of 2019 due to persistent injuries.

In 2020, Walkenhorst made her comeback on the national tour and participated in the German championships.

Professional career

2016: Rio de Janeiro

Kira Walkenhorst participated in the 2016 summer Olympics in Rio together with her teammate Laura Ludwig. They won the gold medal in the final match against the Brazilian duo Ágatha Bednarczuk and Bárbara Seixas in straight sets of 21-18, 21-14 following their victory against the Brazilian duo Larissa França and Talita Antunes in the semi-finals.

2016: World Tour
Walkenhorst competed in the World Tour Finals in Toronto. With teammate Laura they finished 3rd (Last) in Pool-B with 2 losses
In the quarter final match against Ross and Walsh they won in 3 sets of (21-18, 19-21, 15-11), advancing to the semi final against Larissa and Talita of Brazil.

Winning against Brazil in straight sets of (21-19, 21-19) the pair advance to the gold medal match. Another GOLD medal for the Olympic winners in straight sets of (21-18, 21-16) against the Swiss pair of Zumkehr and Heidrich

2017 season
Walkenhorst opened the 2017 season at Fort Lauderdale Major with temporary partner Julia Großner while her regular partner Laura Ludwig recovered from a shoulder injury. They won two out of their three pool play matches to make it through to the Final 24. Here they lost 0:2 to Meppelink / Van Gestel (NED) so finished the tournament in 17th position. At the world championships in Vienna, Ludwig / Walkenhorst won the gold medal after beating Lauren Fendrick and April Ross in the final.

Personal life
In late 2016, Walkenhorst came out as a lesbian. In October 2017, she married her longtime girlfriend and trainer Maria Kleefisch. One year later, her wife Maria gave birth to triplets.

References

External links

 

German women's beach volleyball players
Sportspeople from Essen
1990 births
Living people
Beach volleyball blockers
Beach volleyball players at the 2016 Summer Olympics
Olympic gold medalists for Germany
Olympic medalists in beach volleyball
Olympic beach volleyball players of Germany
Medalists at the 2016 Summer Olympics
Lesbian sportswomen
German LGBT sportspeople
LGBT volleyball players